HMS Battleaxe was a  of the Royal Navy, completed just after the Second World War.

Construction
Battleaxe was one of 19 Weapon-class destroyers ordered as part of the Royal Navy's 1943 War Programme. The Weapons were intended to be built in shipyards where the larger  could not be built, but still mounting the heavy anti-aircraft armament and modern fire-control which war experience had shown to be necessary. As designed, the Weapons were to be armed by six 4-in guns in three twin turrets, two forward and one aft, with radar direction, with a close-in anti-aircraft armament of six 40-mm Bofors guns. Ten 21 inch (533 mm) torpedo tubes were carried in two quintuple mounts, while up to 150 depth charges could be carried.

Battleaxe was laid down on at Yarrows Scotstoun shipyard in Glasgow on 22 April 1944, and was launched on 12 June 1945. The end of the Second World War meant that most of the class were cancelled, with the remaining four ships, including Battleaxe having their armament fit revised to improve their anti-submarine capability. One of the ships' four inch mounts (in Battleaxes case the superimposed forward B-mount, leaving one turret forward and another aft) was removed to allow the fitting of two Squid anti-submarine mortars, while the conventional depth charge armament was also removed. Battleaxe commissioned on 23 October 1947, the first of the four Weapon class to be completed.

Operations
On commissioning, Battleaxe served as the leader of the Home Fleet's 6th Destroyer Flotilla, which consisted of the four Weapon class ships.  It remained part of the 6th Flotilla through the rest of the 1940s and well into the 1950s, deploying to form part of the Mediterranean Fleet from April 1955 to March 1956. In 1953 she took part in the Fleet Review to celebrate the Coronation of Queen Elizabeth II. Later in 1956, Battleaxe was laid off into the reserve.

In 1957, the four Weapon-class destroyers were selected for conversion to Radar pickets in 1957, with Battleaxe being converted at Rosyth Dockyard. The ship's torpedo tubes were removed to allow the fitting of an additional lattice mast carrying a Type 965 long-range air-search radar, with deckhouses built to house the radar equipment and operators. Battleaxes Squid mortars were swapped with the aft mounted 4-inch turret, while a more modern fire control system for the ship's guns were fitted.

Battleaxe recommissioned in February 1959, joining the 2nd Destroyer Squadron based in the Mediterranean, serving there until April 1960 when it transferred back to the British Isles to join the 5th Destroyer Squadron. Duties included fishery protection patrols. On 25 August 1960, she was carrying out steam trials while moored alongside the minelayer  at Portsmouth, when steam was let into the ship's turbines, driving the ship forward and breaking Apollos mooring lines. Apollo then collided with the frigate , which also broke free from her moorings and struck the Caisson at the entrance to a dock. Apollos stem was damaged, while Wakeful suffered buckled plates from the impact by Apollo and a badly damaged bow from the collision with the caisson. On the night of 18/19 September 1960, Battleaxe was berthed at Londonderry Port undergoing minor repairs before being due to depart for an exercise the next morning, when one of her crew cut the feeder cable to the Type 965 radar, putting the radar system out of order. Battleaxe put into Rosyth Dockyard to repair the radar. The crewman responsible was tried and pleaded guilty to wilfully damaging the ship's radar, and was sentenced to 18 months imprisonment and dismissed with disgrace from the Navy.

On 1 August 1962, during a night-time exercise in the Firth of Clyde, Battleaxe collided with the Type 15 frigate . The damage to Battleaxe was considered not economical to repair and the ship was laid up at Rosyth to await disposal. Battleaxe arrived at Blyth Shipbuilding Company for scrapping on 20 October 1964. Three of Battleaxes crew, including her commanding officer, were officially reprimanded by Courts Martial following the accident.

References

Publications

External links
 Scottish Film Archive footage of the damage to Battleaxe and Ursa following their collision

 

Weapon-class destroyers
Ships built on the River Clyde
1945 ships
Cold War destroyers of the United Kingdom